John Stanley Marsh (born 31 August 1940) is an English former professional footballer who played as an inside forward.

Career
Born in Farnworth, Marsh played for Little Hulton, Oldham Athletic and Witton Albion.

References

1940 births
Living people
English footballers
Oldham Athletic A.F.C. players
Witton Albion F.C. players
English Football League players
Association football inside forwards